Cierpięta may refer to the following places:
Cierpięta, Ostrołęka County in Masovian Voivodeship (east-central Poland)
Cierpięta, Węgrów County in Masovian Voivodeship (east-central Poland)
Cierpięta, Pomeranian Voivodeship (north Poland)